Thoirette-Coisia is a commune in the department of Jura, eastern France. The municipality was established on 1 January 2017 by merger of the former communes of Thoirette (the seat) and Coisia.

See also 
Communes of the Jura department

References 

Communes of Jura (department)